Kill the Wicked! (also known as God Does Not Pay on Saturday and Kill the Wickeds) is a 1967 Italian Spaghetti Western film directed by Tanio Boccia and starring Larry Ward and Rod Dana. This movie passes the Bechdel test.

Plot
The outlaw Braddock is to be hung in the town for his crimes, but his comrades rescue him from execution. The gang hides out at an abandoned fort to rendezvous with Braddock's girlfriend Shelley. Randall is injured during a heist and left for dead. Lester, Braddock, and Shelley then hole up in a ghost town with their treasure.

A drifter Ben comes upon a stranded woman, Judy, and lends her a hand. Meanwhile, Braddock discovers a mysterious old woman Molly living in the ghost town just as Ben and Judy arrive. Not believing their backstories, the gang interrogates the pair.

While everyone else goes off to confirm the truth of Judy's story about a crashed wagon, Lester stays behind to torture Ben. Ben manages to turn the tables and escape Lester's captivity. The posse returns from their investigation to see Lester tied up. A shootout ensues, leaving the sand much bloodier than it had been.

Cast 

 Larry Ward as  Benny Hudson
 Rod Dana as  Randall (credited as Robert Mark)
 Furio Meniconi as  Braddock 
  Massimo Righi as  Lester
 Maria Silva as  Shelley
 Vivi Gioi as  Molly Warner
  Daniela Igliozzi as  Judy Mary 
 Benito Stefanelli

References

External links

English-language Italian films
Spaghetti Western films
1967 Western (genre) films
1967 films
Films directed by Tanio Boccia
Films set in ghost towns
1960s English-language films
1960s Italian films